Manuel (foaled 27 September 2013 - 24 January 2020) was a Group 1 winning Australian thoroughbred racehorse.

Background
Manuel was sold at the 2015 Inglis Easter yearling sale for A$240,000.

Racing career
Manuel won the 2019 C F Orr Stakes at Caulfield Racecourse when leading all the way at odds of 20/1.  
This was Manuel's first attempt at a Group 1 race.

Death
On the 24 January 2020, Manuel was euthanised at Moonee Valley Racecourse after suffering severe injuries when falling in the Australia Stakes.

References 

2013 racehorse births
Racehorses bred in Australia
Racehorses trained in Australia
2020 racehorse deaths
Horses who died from racing injuries